Singhbhum Lok Sabha constituency is one of the 14 Lok Sabha (parliamentary) constituencies in Jharkhand state in eastern India. This constituency is reserved for the candidates belonging to the Scheduled tribes. This constituency covers the entire West Singhbhum district and part of Seraikela Kharsawan district.

Assembly segments
Singhbhum Lok Sabha constituency comprises the following six Vidhan Sabha (legislative assembly) segments:

Members of Parliament

Election Results

2019

2014

2009

See also
 West Singhbhum district
 List of Constituencies of the Lok Sabha

Notes

External links 
Singhbhum lok sabha  constituency election 2019 result details
 http://eciresults.ap.nic.in/ConstituencywiseS272.htm?ac=2

Lok Sabha constituencies in Jharkhand
West Singhbhum district